Hol Maren is a mansion in Oegstgeest, Netherlands on the Haarlemmertrekvaart, 21. The mansion was built in 1892 and was designed by the architect Hendrik Jesse (1860-1943) for the landowner and river fish trader Johannes Spaargaren.

The mansion is shaped as a block in old Dutch style with elements from the Dutch Neo-Renaissance, such as decorative arcs above the windows on the ground floor. The garden has the characteristics of a park.

Hol Maren is a municipal monument since 1991.

References

External links
 Website about H.J. Jesse with picture of Hol Maren (WebCite archive)
 More pictures of Hol Maren (WebCite archive)

Houses in the Netherlands